Mathias Kneißl, known as Robber Kneißl (in German Räuber Kneißl, in Austro-Bavarian Raiba Kneißl), (4 August 1875 in Unterweikertshofen – 21 February 1902) was a German outlaw, poacher and popular antihero in the Bavarian folklore of the Dachau district when the Kingdom of Bavaria was part of the Second Reich. Chased by scores of green-uniformed rural policemen, who were already widely considered to be corrupt and who were further disliked for being Franconians who could not speak the local Upper Bavarian dialect, Kneißl became a folk hero to the local populatiom because of his repeated humiliations of the police. According to German forensic scientist Mark Benecke, Mathias Kneissl never saw himself as a Robin Hood figure and was, in reality, "just a man who went astray with no way of getting back."

Life
Mathias Kneißl was born on 4 August, 1875, as the eldest of six children of a poor innkeeper. In 1886 his parents, who were later described as having "unknown origins" and as, "ill-tempered", purchased the mill at Sulzemoos Schacher. The mill was "a strategically remote location", and was often used as a secret meeting place for local criminals.

When he was twelve years of age, a school report card wrote about Kneissl, "He is not totally devoid of gifts, but he is lazy beyond imagination. He never pays attention, his output doesn't exist. It is useless to scold him or punish him. He has no love of school whatsoever."

Kneissl then began accompanying his brothers at an early age while poaching. At age 16 he was imprisoned for the first time, because members of his family were suspected of cattle raiding. His father was arrested for plundering the pilgrimage shrine of Herrgottsruh at Friedberg in 1892 and died soon after while in police custody in the town of Dachau. Soon after, Kneissl's mother was also arrested and imprisoned for poaching and her sons began to skip school in favor of similarly poaching instead. 

On 2 November 1893, Police Constables Gösswein and Förtsch arrived at the Schacher Mill to arrest Mathias and Alois Kneissl for poaching. Instead of surrendering peacefully, the Kneissl brothers opened fire, severely wounded both officers, and fled the scene. After being arrested a few days later, the Kneissl brothers were put on trial for robbery, poaching, receiving stolen goods, resisting arrest, and attempted murder. They were found guilty; Alois Kneissl was sentenced to 15 years imprisonment. Mathias Kneissl received a sentence of 6 years.

After serving his sentence, he was released in February 1899 and worked as a carpenter in Nußdorf am Inn. After six months Kneißl was dismissed by his master, because his colleagues refused to work with him any longer. Due to his bad reputation, he was unable to find another job.

For two years, Kneißl was pursued by the police. After his accomplices were arrested, he continued committing armed robberies on his own. An attempt to arrest him occurred on 30 November 1900 in Irchenbrunn Altomünster. In a massive gun battle, two policemen were injured so badly that they subsequently died. Three months later, in March 1901, Kneißl was captured at Geisen Egenhofen by sixty policemen. During the preceding gunfight, Kneißl was seriously injured by a bullet in the abdomen.

Trial
Between 14 and 19 November 1901 Kneißl was placed on trial at Augsburg. He was charged with two murders, attempted murder, as well as armed robbery and extortion. At his trial, which was followed by the media with great attention, Kneißl said, "As my bad luck would have it I had to go to the same school right up to my seventeenth year, just because Pastor Endl could not stand me and kept harassing me. Many of my friends left school long before I learned as much as the others. For the final exams, I was the only one told to do a calculation on the blackboard. I didn't want to do it. I don't accept unfairness. I will not bow even if it kills me."

Kneißl confessed to most of the charges, but denied an intent to kill against the two policemen who were shot by him. However, the court found him guilty of murder, premeditated bodily harm with fatal consequences, extortion and for aggravated robbery.

The Court then sentenced him to receive the death penalty for murder and 15 years imprisonment on the other charges. Sentenced on a Monday, Kneißl allegedly sarcastically remarked: "Well, that's a good start of a week."

Judge Anton Rebholz appealed by letter to the Ministry of Justice, which confirmed Kneißl's death sentence. Kneißl was awakened shortly after seven o'clock on the morning of 21 February 1902. He was then executed via guillotine. The executioner was Franz Xaver Reichhart.

Legacy
Kneißl was already a legendary figure  during his own lifetime. The people, especially the small farmers of Bavaria saw in his outlaw life something revolutionary, a rebellion against the authorities. Even in recent times the Kneißl legend remains popular. Musical examples include the songs "Kneißl" by Georg Ringsgwandl (1993) and "Schachermüller-Hiasl" by Schandmaul (2016).

References

Further reading 
Räuberhauptmann Kneißl vor dem Schwurgericht In: Hugo Friedländer: Interessante Kriminal-Prozesse von kulturhistorischer Bedeutung. 1911–1921, vol. 2, pp. 192–221.
Wilhelm Lukas Kristl: Das traurige und stolze Leben des Mathias Kneißl—Bayerns großer Kriminalfall". Munich, 1957. 
Marlene Reidel (illustration), Wilhelm Lukas Christl: Der Räuber Kneißl. Ebenhausen near Munich, 1966. 
Manfred Böckl: Mathias Kneißl - Der Raubschütz von der Schachermühle, Dachau, 1998.  
Michael Farin: Polizeireport München 1799-1999. 2001, 
Oliver Herbrich: Mathias Kneißl - Theo Berger. Volkshelden wider Willen'' (German language) Fiction - Non-Fiction Film Edition, 2018. 

1875 births
1902 deaths
People from Dachau (district)
German folklore
Criminals from Bavaria
German people convicted of murdering police officers
German outlaws
People executed by Germany by decapitation
People executed for murdering police officers
People executed by the German Empire
Executed people from Bavaria
20th-century executions by Germany